Bettany Mary Hughes  (born May 1967) is an English historian, author and broadcaster, specialising in classical history. Her published books cover classical antiquity and myth, and the history of Istanbul. She is active in efforts to encourage the teaching of the classics in UK state schools. Hughes was appointed OBE in 2019.

Early life and education
Hughes grew up in West London. She is the daughter of the actor Peter Hughes, and the sister of the cricketer and journalist Simon Hughes. She was educated at Notting Hill and Ealing High School in Ealing, and at St Hilda's College, Oxford, where she graduated with a degree in ancient and modern history.

She has an honorary doctorate from the University of York.

Career

She is a visiting research fellow at King's College London, formerly a tutor for Cambridge University's Institute of Continuing Education, and an honorary fellow at Cardiff University.

Hughes has written and presented many documentary films and series on both ancient and modern subjects. In 2009, she was awarded the Naomi Sargant Special Award for excellence in educational broadcasting, and in 2012 she was awarded the Norton Medlicott Award for services to history by the Historical Association, of which she is an honorary fellow.

In 2010, she gave the Hellenic Institute's Tenth Annual lecture "Ta Erotika: The Things of Love";  in 2011, Hughes gave the Royal Television Society's Huw Wheldon Memorial Lecture, in which she argued that history on television is thriving and enjoying a new golden age. In 2011, she chaired the Orange Prize for Fiction, the UK's only annual book award for fiction written by women.

Hughes is a patron of The Iris Project, a charity that promotes the teaching of Latin and Greek in UK state schools. She is an honorary patron of Classics For All, a national campaign to get classical languages and the study of ancient civilisations back into state schools. She is an advisor to the Foundation for Science, Technology and Civilisation which aims to foster large-scale collaborative projects between East and West.

In 2014, she was made a Distinguished Friend of the University of Oxford. 

She was elected as a Fellow of the Society of Antiquaries of London (FSA) on 3 March 2017. She was appointed Officer of the Order of the British Empire (OBE) in the 2019 Birthday Honours for services to history.

Personal life 
Hughes is married to Adrian Evans, events director and producer, who was pageant master for the Diamond and Platinum Jubilees; the couple have two daughters Sorrel and May. 

Hughes is a vegetarian. In 2016, she delivered the British Humanist Association's annual Voltaire Lecture.

Recognition
She was recognized as one of the BBC's 100 women of 2013.

Books
Hughes has written four books:

 Helen of Troy: Goddess, Princess, Whore (2005)
 The Hemlock Cup: Socrates, Athens and the Search for the Good Life (2010)
 Istanbul: A Tale of Three Cities (2017)
 Venus and Aphrodite (2019)

The Hemlock Cup was included in The New York Times Bestseller List. It was chosen as Book of the Year by The Daily Telegraph, and it was featured as a Book of the Week on BBC Radio 4. It was shortlisted for a Writer's Guild Award.

Istanbul was reviewed by The New York Review of Books and was shortlisted for the Runciman Award in 2018.

Venus and Aphrodite was shortlisted in 2021 for the Runciman Award.

Other writings
 "Helen of Troy: Goddess, Princess, Whore" – European Cultural Centre of Delphi, XIII International Meeting On Ancient Drama 2007, The Women in Ancient Drama, Symposium Proceedings
"'Terrible, Excruciating, Wrong-Headed And Ineffectual': The Perils and Pleasures of Presenting Antiquity to a Television Audience" – Dunstan Lowe, Kim Shahabudin (ed.), Classics for All: Reworking Antiquity in Mass Culture. Newcastle upon Tyne:  Cambridge Scholars Publishing, 2009,

Credits

Television programmes

References

External links

Bettany Hughes Official Web site

21st-century English historians
Historians of antiquity
English classical scholars
Women classical scholars
English documentary filmmakers
English television presenters
Alumni of St Hilda's College, Oxford
1967 births
Living people
People from Ealing
People educated at Notting Hill & Ealing High School
BBC 100 Women
British women historians
Women documentary filmmakers
Officers of the Order of the British Empire
Fellows of the Society of Antiquaries of London